The 1970 Football Cup of Ukrainian SSR among KFK  was the annual season of Ukraine's football knockout competition for amateur football teams.

Competition schedule

Preliminary round

|}
Notes:

First qualification round

{{OneLegResult|FC Torpedo Nizhyn|| 1–2 |FC Bilshovyk Kyiv}}

|}Notes:Second qualification round

|}Notes:'''
 The match Karpaty – Tsementnyk originally ended in victory of Kolomyia team, but its result was scratched, and victory was awarded to Mykolaiv.

Quarterfinals (1/4)

|}

Semifinals (1/2)

|}

Final

|}

See also
 1970 KFK competitions (Ukraine)

External links
 1970. regional-football.ru
 Кубок Украины среди любителей 1970. footballfacts.ru

Ukrainian Amateur Cup
Ukrainian Amateur Cup
Amateur Cup